Car 54, Where Are You? is a 1994 comedy film directed by Bill Fishman and stars David Johansen and John C. McGinley. It is based on the television series of the same name starring Joe E. Ross and Fred Gwynne that ran from 1961 to 1963.

Reprising their roles from the original series are Nipsey Russell, whose character Anderson is now a captain, and Al Lewis, whose officer Schnauser now spends his time watching TV reruns of The Munsters (in which Lewis and Gwynne also starred).

The film was originally produced as a musical comedy but released without the filmed musical interludes.

Synopsis
Partnered in Car 54 are the brash Gunther Toody and the prim, proper Francis Muldoon. Toody and Muldoon's boss, Captain Anderson, assigns them to protect citizen Herbert Hortz, an important witness in the impending trial of local organized crime boss Don Motti. At the same time, the two officers must deal with upheavals in their personal lives, as well as the day-to-day travails of being beat cops.

Cast
 David Johansen as Officer Gunther Toody
 John C. McGinley as Officer Francis Muldoon
 Fran Drescher as Velma Velour
 Nipsey Russell as Police Captain Dave Anderson
 Rosie O'Donnell as Lucille Toody
 Al Lewis as Officer Leo Schnauser 
 Daniel Baldwin as Don Motti
 Jeremy Piven as Herbert Hortz
 Tone Loc as Handsome cab driver
 The Ramones as themselves
 Penn and Teller as the Luthers

Production
Though the film was shot in 1990, it was edited several times and as a result wasn't released until 1994. It was originally filmed as a musical, but most of the musical numbers were cut from the released film. Nipsey Russell and Al Lewis appear as older versions of their roles from the original series.

Reception
The film received universally negative reviews. 

The film won a Golden Raspberry Award for Worst Supporting Actress (Rosie O'Donnell), along with Exit to Eden and The Flintstones;
and won a Stinkers Bad Movie Awards for Worst Resurrection of a TV Show and was nominated for Worst Picture and Worst Actress (O'Donnell), along with Exit to Eden and The Flintstones.

Year-end lists 
 Top 10 worst (not ranked) – Betsy Pickle, Knoxville News-Sentinel
 Top 12 worst (Alphabetically ordered, not ranked) – David Elliott, The San Diego Union-Tribune

References

External links
 
 
 
 

1994 films
1994 comedy films
1990s crime comedy films
1990s police comedy films
American crime comedy films
1990s English-language films
Films based on television series
Films set in New York City
Films shot in New York City
Orion Pictures films
Fictional portrayals of the New York City Police Department
Films about the New York City Police Department
Films directed by Bill Fishman
Golden Raspberry Award winning films
1990s American films